Diuris pardina, commonly known as the leopard orchid or leopard doubletail is a species of orchid which is endemic to south-eastern Australia. It has two or three grass-like leaves and up to ten yellow flowers with reddish-brown marks and blotches.

Description
The flowers are yellow and heavily blotched with dark reddish-brown. Flowering occurs from August to October.

Taxonomy and naming
Diuris pardina was first formally described in 1840 by John Lindley and the description was published in his book, The Genera and Species of Orchidaceous Plants. The specific epithet (pardina) is derived from the Ancient Greek word pardos meaning "leopard".

Distribution and habitat
The leopard orchid is found in New South Wales, the Australian Capital Territory, Victoria, South Australia and Tasmania. It grows in well-drained soils in heath and forest and there is considerable variation in the colouration of the flowers. In New South Wales in occurs south from Mudgee and in Victoria it is widespread and common in the southern half of the state.

References

Orchids of New South Wales
Orchids of South Australia
Orchids of Tasmania
Orchids of Victoria (Australia)
Orchids of the Australian Capital Territory
Endemic orchids of Australia
pardina
Plants described in 1840